William Lewis Norman (c. 1873 – 16 September 1931) was an English football manager for Blackpool and Hartlepools United. He managed a total of 345 games, securing a 37.7 win-percentage over his career.

Career 
After leaving the Army, Norman became a trainer at Barnsley. He left to join Birmingham City for a season in 1905 but returned to Oakwell, where he remained until 1913.

He joined Huddersfield Town, along with Arthur Fairclough, in 1913.

Between 1918 and 1923, he was in charge of Blackpool, who became one of a growing number of clubs to appoint a full-time manager. Before that point, the team selection had been the responsibility of a committee comprising directors, the captain, and vice-captain. In his four seasons in charge at Bloomfield Road he led the Seasiders to challenge seriously for promotion on three occasions.

Upon taking up his position at the seaside, Norman immediately implemented spartan training routines, assisted by his son-in-law, Allan Ure, who was also the club's trainer. This disciplined regime led to his nickname of "Sergeant-major".

After World War One, the job of rebuilding the team was always going to be a difficult one. He could rely on a number of established players, but he was also prepared to move into the transfer market as necessary, which he did frequently. His most successful signing was one Harry Bedford in March 1921.

In 1919–20, Norman's second season at the Blackpool helm, the club missed out on promotion by a narrow margin, finishing fourth, but the sale of Joe Lane (who had scored 26 goals in 30 appearances in the league) in early March (after a 6-0 drubbing at South Shields, no less) did not exactly endear him to the Tangerine faithful. The following season saw Blackpool finish fourth again.

After spending heavily prior to the 1921–22 season, the club struggled against relegation; indeed, only a double victory over West Ham United at the end of the season saved Blackpool from relegation into Division Three North.

Despite attracting several critics, Norman led Blackpool to the top of the table for the majority of the 1922–23 season, but once again the team collapsed in the latter stages and promotion passed them by again.

In the summer of 1923, Norman and Ure left Blackpool to join Leeds United. At Elland Road, the former became assistant to Arthur Fairclough, with whom he had worked at Barnsley.

Norman helped take Leeds into Division One. However, when the Yorkshire club was relegated in 1927, both he and Fairclough resigned.

Norman joined Hartlepools United as manager, and although he did not have much success at the Victoria Ground, he did discover W.G. Richardson, who later became a star with West Bromwich Albion. Norman was Hartlepools manager until his death on 16 September 1931.

Managerial stats

References
Specific

General

External links
Norman's managerial profile at Soccerbase

Year of birth unknown
1931 deaths
People from Gazeley
English football managers
Barnsley F.C. non-playing staff
Birmingham City F.C. non-playing staff
Leeds United F.C. non-playing staff
Blackpool F.C. managers
Hartlepool United F.C. managers
Year of birth uncertain